Hamstead Marshall (also spelt Hampstead Marshall) is a village and civil parish in the English county of Berkshire. The village is located within the North Wessex Downs.  The population of this civil parish at the 2011 census was 275.

Location and amenities
The village contains scattered settlements such as Ash Tree Corner, Chapel Corner, Holtwood and Irish Hill. There is a 12th-century church (St Mary's), canine rescue kennels, the White Hart Inn, Hamstead Marshall's pub for several centuries. There is a village hall, until 1933 it was the primary school, in which community events are held regularly, and it is also used for private bookings. The former Organic Research Centre at Elm Farm closed in 2019 and its land and buildings sold off.

History

Hamstead Marshall has three sites of medieval motte-and-bailey castles, all on private land, with one a possible site of Newbury Castle. All are registered historic monuments. William Marshall, who became Earl of Pembroke, was a loyal knight to four kings: Henry II, Richard I, King John, and Henry III and this is when the Marshall suffix was added to the village. The manor house continued to be owned and used by kings and queens throughout the centuries, until it was sold in 1613. 

The village was, from 1620 until the 1980s, the seat of the Earls of Craven. William Craven built a mansion there, originally intended as a residence for Charles I's sister, Elizabeth of Bohemia, although she died before construction began. It burnt down in 1718. The Cravens later expanded a hunting lodge to live in instead, and this still stands, privately occupied, in the centre of Hamstead Park. Until the mid-twentieth century the Craven family owned most of the village, but successive sales by the estate put almost all the houses into private ownership by 1980, most of them now owner-occupied. About 17 houses are owned by the Sovereign Housing Association.

Geography
The village landscape comprises farmland, woodland and parkland. No A or B roads traverse this but Hamstead Marshall has bus services. The River Kennet and the Kennet and Avon Canal pass through the northern edge of the village, and the River Enborne marks the southern boundary. About half the property pre-dates 1900, and 32 buildings or structures such as walls are listed buildings.  The village has four areas designated sites of Special Scientific Interest (SSSI), these are Hamstead Marshall Pit, Irish Hill Copse, Redhill Wood and the River Kennet.

Demography

Notes

References

External links

Village website

 
Villages in Berkshire
Civil parishes in Berkshire
West Berkshire District
Craven family